List of Al-Arabi SC former players since 1960.

Players
 

 
{|
|-
|valign="top"|

|width="1"| 
|valign="top"|

|width="1"| 
|valign="top"|

|width="1"| 
|valign="top"|

Al-Arabi
 
Association football player non-biographical articles